KEGS may refer to:

 King Edward's School (disambiguation), or King Edward's Grammar School
 King Edward VI Aston, also known as KEGS Aston
 King Edward VI Camp Hill, also known as KEGS Camp Hill
 King Edward VI Grammar School, Chelmsford, also known as KEGS Chelmsford
 King Edward VI College, Nuneaton, Warwickshire, formerly King Edward VI Grammar School, also known as KEGS Nuneaton
 King Edward VI Five Ways, also known as KEGS Five Ways
 KEGS (TV), a television station (channel 7) licensed to Goldfield, Nevada, United States
 KEGS-LP, a defunct television station (channel 30) formerly licensed to Las Vegas, Nevada, a repeater of KEGS
 KEGS (emulator), an Apple IIgs computer emulator

See also
 Keg